Porogadus is a genus of cusk-eels.

Species
There are currently 13 recognized species in this genus:
 Porogadus abyssalis Nybelin, 1957
 Porogadus atripectus Garman, 1899
 Porogadus catena (Goode & Bean, 1885)
 Porogadus gracilis (Günther, 1878) (Cavernous assfish)
 Porogadus guentheri D. S. Jordan & Fowler, 1902
 Porogadus longiceps Garman, 1899
 Porogadus melampeplus (Alcock, 1896)
 Porogadus melanocephalus (Alcock, 1891)
 Porogadus miles Goode & T. H. Bean, 1885 (Slender cusk-eel)
 Porogadus nudus Vaillant, 1888
 Porogadus silus H. J. Carter & Sulak, 1984
 Porogadus subarmatus Vaillant, 1888
 Porogadus trichiurus (Alcock, 1890)

References

Ophidiidae